Sarhad is a town in Ghotki District, Sindh, Pakistan. It is located on N5 National Highway at KM marker no 554.

References

Cities and towns in Ghotki District